Christine J. Kilduff (born 1966) is an American lawyer and politician. A Democrat, she served in the Washington House of Representatives January 12, 2015 to January 11, 2021. She was elected in 2014, narrowly defeating Paul Wagemann of the Republican Party in the general election. She has also served as president of the school board in the University Place School District and worked as a Washington state assistant attorney general.

Personal life
Kilduff is married with children. She and her wife reside in University Place. Kilduff is fluent in several languages, including Spanish.

References

1966 births
Living people
People from University Place, Washington
Washington (state) lawyers
Democratic Party members of the Washington House of Representatives
Women state legislators in Washington (state)
Lesbian politicians
LGBT state legislators in Washington (state)
21st-century American politicians
21st-century American women politicians
21st-century LGBT people